Indaial is a city in the state of Santa Catarina, Brazil. It is located on the left bank of Itajaí River, and 160 km from the capital of the state, Florianópolis.

The city is of European origin, with many textiles industries and strong agricultural activity. It was colonized about 1860 by Germans, Italians and Poles. Before the colonization it was populated by Tapajós and Carijós Indians, that are now names of two big neighborhoods in Indaial.

References 

Municipalities in Santa Catarina (state)